The Natives Are Restless is the third and last studio release by the American speed metal band Hawaii and the only one to feature guitarist Tom Azevedo, formerly of Honolulu band Rat Attack.

It is also the band's only album to see an official overseas release, with France's Axe Killer Records and Germany's SPV/Steamhammer both issuing the record in Europe, using individual cover artwork.  SPV would re-issue the album on CD in 1988; Axe Killer followed in 1997 and again in 2007.

The song "Beg for Mercy" was originally recorded by Marty Friedman with his previous band Vixen for their 1983 Made In Hawaii EP.

Track listing

Personnel 
Hawaii
Eddie Day – lead vocals 
Marty Friedman – lead guitar, backing vocals 
Tom Azevedo – rhythm guitar
Joey Galisa – bass guitar
Jeff Graves – drums, backing vocals

Production
Pierre Grill - engineer, mixing
Darryl Amaki, Harris Okuda - executive producers

References

Hawaii (band) albums
1985 albums
SPV/Steamhammer albums